Local elections were held in West Pokot to elect a Governor and County Assembly on 4 March 2013. Under the new constitution, which was passed in a 2010 referendum, the 2013 general elections were the first in which Governors and members of the County Assemblies for the newly created counties were elected.

Gubernatorial election

References

 

2013 local elections in Kenya